The 2022–23 Wichita State Shockers men's basketball team represented Wichita State University in the 2022–23 NCAA Division I men's basketball season. The Shockers, led by third year head coach Isaac Brown, played their home games at Charles Koch Arena in Wichita, Kansas as members of the American Athletic Conference.

Previous season
The Shockers finished the 2021–22 season 15–13, 6–9 in AAC play to finish in seventh place. They lost in the first round of the AAC tournament to Tulsa.

Offseason

Departures

Incoming transfers

Recruiting classes

2022 recruiting class 
There were no incoming recruits for the class of 2022.

2023 recruiting class

Roster

Schedule and results

|-
!colspan=12 style=| Exhibition

|-
!colspan=12 style=| Non-conference regular season

|-
!colspan=12 style=| AAC Regular Season

|-
!colspan=12 style=| AAC tournament

Source

References

Wichita State
Wichita State Shockers men's basketball seasons
Wichita State
Wichita State